The Pythagoras tree is a plane fractal constructed from squares. Invented by the Dutch mathematics teacher Albert E. Bosman in 1942, it is named after the ancient Greek mathematician Pythagoras because each triple of touching squares encloses a right triangle, in a configuration traditionally used to depict the Pythagorean theorem.
If the largest square has a size of L × L, the entire Pythagoras tree fits snugly inside a box of size 6L × 4L. The finer details of the tree resemble the Lévy C curve.

Construction
The construction of the Pythagoras tree begins with a square. Upon this square are constructed two squares, each scaled down by a linear factor of /2, such that the corners of the squares coincide pairwise. The same procedure is then applied recursively to the two smaller squares, ad infinitum. The illustration below shows the first few iterations in the construction process.

This is the simplest symmetric triangle. Alternatively, the sides of the triangle are recursively equal proportions, leading to the sides being proportional to the square root of the inverse golden ratio, and the areas of the squares being in golden ratio proportion.

Area
Iteration n in the construction adds 2n squares of area , for a total area of 1. Thus the area of the tree might seem to grow without bound in the limit as n → ∞. However, some of the squares overlap starting at the order 5 iteration, and the tree actually has a finite area because it fits inside a 6×4 box.

It can be shown easily that the area A of the Pythagoras tree must be in the range 5 < A < 18, which can be narrowed down further with extra effort. Little seems to be known about the actual value of A.

Varying the angle
An interesting set of variations can be constructed by maintaining an isosceles triangle but changing the base angle (90 degrees for the standard Pythagoras tree). In particular, when the base half-angle is set to (30°) = arcsin(0.5), it is easily seen that the size of the squares remains constant. The first overlap occurs at the fourth iteration. The general pattern produced is the rhombitrihexagonal tiling, an array of hexagons bordered by the constructing squares.

In the limit where the half-angle is 90 degrees, there is obviously no overlap, and the total area is twice the area of the base square.  It would be interesting to know if there's an algorithmic relationship between the value of the base half-angle and the iteration at which the squares first overlap each other.

History
The Pythagoras tree was first constructed by Albert E. Bosman (1891–1961), a Dutch mathematics teacher, in 1942.

See also
 Lévy C curve

References

External links

 Gallery of Pythagoras trees
 Interactive generator with code
 
 Pythagoras Tree by Enrique Zeleny based on a program by Eric W. Weisstein, The Wolfram Demonstrations Project.
 
 Three-dimensional Pythagoras tree
 MatLab script to generate Pythagoras Tree
 Construction step by step in the virtual reality software Neotrie VR
 

Fractals